Developed by James Duesenberry, the relative income hypothesis states that an individual’s attitude to consumption and saving is dictated more by his income in relation to others than by abstract standard of living; the percentage of income consumed by an individual depends on his percentile position within the income distribution.

Secondly, it hypothesizes that the present consumption is not influenced merely by present levels of absolute and relative income, but also by levels of consumption attained in a previous period. It is difficult for a family to reduce a level of consumption once attained. The aggregate ratio of consumption to income is assumed to depend on the level of present income relative to past peak income.

References

Further reading
Duesenberry, J. S. Income, Saving and the Theory of Consumer Behaviour. Cambridge: Harvard University Press, 1949.
Frank, Robert H., 2005. “The Mysterious Disappearance of James Duesenberry,” The New York Times, June 9, 2005.
Hollander, Heinz, 2001. “On the validity of utility statements: standard theory versus Duesenberry’s,” Journal of economic Behavior & Organization 45, 3: 227-249.

Economic theories
Behavioral economics